Sun Hung Kai Centre is an office skyscraper in Wan Chai, Hong Kong Island, Hong Kong. It is 215 metres tall consisting 53 floors. When the building was first completed in 1981, only 51 floors were present. Five extra stories were added atop in 1991.

It serves as the corporate headquarters of Sun Hung Kai Properties.

The consulates of Brazil, Russia and Myanmar in Hong Kong are housed in the building. In July 2019 the Russian consulate located within was hit by an online bomb threat originating from a user calling himself "chichoonkeat".

See also
 List of tallest buildings in Hong Kong

References

External links

 Building's Website

Skyscraper office buildings in Hong Kong
Office buildings completed in 1980
Wan Chai
1980 establishments in Hong Kong